Oman competed at the 2019 World Aquatics Championships in Gwangju, South Korea from 12 to 28 July.

Swimming

Oman entered one swimmer.

Men

References

Nations at the 2019 World Aquatics Championships
Oman at the World Aquatics Championships
2019 in Omani sport